Johannes Trefz (born 7 June 1992 in Starnberg) is a German sprinter specialising in the 400 metres. He won a bronze medal in the 4 × 400 metres relay at the 2011 European Junior Championships.

His personal best in the event is 45.70 seconds set in Nuremberg in 2018.

In 2019, he won the bronze medal in the team event at the 2019 European Games held in Minsk, Belarus.

International competitions

References

1992 births
Living people
German male sprinters
People from Starnberg
Sportspeople from Upper Bavaria
Athletes (track and field) at the 2019 European Games
European Games medalists in athletics
European Games bronze medalists for Germany